Beaverburn was the name of two steamships operated by the Canadian Pacific Railway:

, torpedoed and sunk in 1940
, sold to Ben Line in 1960

Ship names